Paternally-expressed gene 3 protein is a protein that in humans is encoded by the PEG3 gene. PEG3 is an imprinted gene expressed exclusively from the paternal allele and plays important roles in controlling fetal growth rates and nurturing behaviors as has potential roles in mammalian reproduction.  PEG3 is a transcription factor that binds to DNA [11-13] via the sequence motif AGTnnCnnnTGGCT, which it binds to using multiple Kruppel-like factors. It also regulate the expression of Pgm2l1 through the binding of the motif.

Interactions
PEG3 has been shown to interact with SIAH2 and SIAH1.
kjh-5oil2-*m
jhac-*n.,myr0.

References

Further reading